Raymond Harry "Ray" Brown (born November 7, 1946) is an American composer, arranger, trumpet player, and jazz educator. He has performed as trumpet player and arranged music for Stan Kenton (early 1970s), Bill Watrous, Bill Berry, Frank Capp – Nat Pierce (Juggernaut Big Band), and the Full Faith and Credit Big Band.

Career 
Brown joined Kenton in September 1971, succeeding Gary Lee Pack [b. 1950; Director of Jazz Studies (retired), University of Southern Maine], holding the jazz trumpet chair and serving as an improv clinician. The Kenton trumpet section included Mike Vax, Jay Saunders, and Dennis Noday. Brown also contributed arrangements for Kenton, including "Mi Burrito" and "Neverbird."  Brown remained with the Kenton Orchestra until November 1972.

Before joining the Kenton Orchestra, Brown had served as arranger and trumpeter with the Studio Band of The United States Army Field Band at Fort Meade, Maryland (1968–71). His tenure with the Army Band and Kenton coincided closely with that of Jay Saunders — trumpet player, and jazz educator, who, while with the Kenton Orchestra, eventually played lead trumpet.

Brown also has performed with Mundell Lowe, Leroy Vinnegar, Ray Brown, Thad Jones, Jimmy Heath, Steve Gadd, and Billy Hart.

Brown conducted the recording session of the Roy Hargrove Quintet entitled Roy Hargrove with Strings, Moment to Moment, released May 2000 on Verve. He has appeared at the Monterey Jazz Festival frequently as conductor of his wife Susan Cahill Brown's Monterey Jazz Festival Chamber Orchestra in collaboration with Charlie Haden, Kenny Barron, Michael Brecker, Ralph Towner, Gary Burton, and Terence Blanchard.
 
Brown currently leads his own big band, the Great Big Band, which has performed at the Monterey Jazz Festival, the San Jose Jazz Festival, the Santa Cruz Jazz Festival, the  Lake Tahoe Music Festival, and jazz venues in the San Francisco Bay area.

Ray is currently on the faculty of Cabrillo College in Aptos, California, teaching jazz improvisation, arranging, and jazz ensembles.

Formal education
 1964 — graduated Freeport High School (New York)
 1968 — Bachelor of Music, Ithaca College School of Music (attended 1964-68)
 19?? — Master of Science, C.W. Post Campus of Long Island University
 19?? — arranging lessons from Willie Maiden
 19?? — arranging lessons from Manny Albam
 19?? — arranging lessons from Rayburn Wright (1922–1990)
 19?? — arranging lessons from Hank Levy
 19?? — arranging lessons from Glenn Earl Brown (Ray's father)
 19??-?? — four summers, Lake Shore Music Camp, headed by Ray's father, Glenn Earl Brown

Early career
 1968-71 — arranger and trumpet player for the Studio Band of The United States Army Field Band, Fort Meade, Maryland
 Sept. 1971 – Nov. 1972 — trumpet player (jazz chair) and improv clinician with the Stan Kenton Orchestra
 1973 — became a member of ASCAP
 1973-74 — trumpet player for Bill Watrous Band in New York
 1973-75 — led own rehearsal band in New York City
 Mar. 1975 — Grant: Jazz, Category I, National Endowment for the Arts (to write a composition for the rehearsal band)
 1974-75 — teacher of improv. in nine New Jersey schools through a grant from the New Jersey State Council on the Arts
 1974-75 — faculty member (teaching arranging, improv, brass), Five Towns College, Merrick, NY
 1974-79 — played trumpet with the New York Orchestra, Thad Jones, Joe Newman, Ray Brown (bassist), Leroy Vinnegar, Mundell Lowe, Bill Berry (William Richard Berry) Big Band
 1980 — Nat Pierce & Frankie Capp Big Band

Musical family
Ray's wife, Sue Brown  (b. 1949, New York), is a violinist and teacher of strings – violin, viola, chamber music, and orchestra.  She holds a Bachelor of Music from Ithaca College (1971) and a Master of Fine Arts from Sarah Lawrence College (1974), where she studied with Dorothy DeLay. She also did post-grad work at the University of Colorado (1975). Ray and Sue were married on August 26, 1973, and together, they have three daughters, one of whom, Karin, is a violinist and is married to cellist Daniel Levitov.  Karin earned degrees in music from Oberlin Conservatory of Music (1998) and Juilliard. Daniel is a member of the preparatory faculty at the Peabody Institute.

Ray, born 1946 in Oceanside, New York, grew up in Freeport, New York. He has three older brothers, Glenn Edward Brown (1937–2007), Stephen Charles Brown, Roger V. Brown and a younger sister, Jeanne De Martino.  
 Glenn taught music for 28 years.
 Steve is a jazz guitarist, bassist, drummer, composer, and arranger.  For 45 years, Steve was professor of music and director of jazz studies at the Ithaca College School of Music (retired 2008). One of Steve's many life achievements is that he formalized jazz studies in 1968 at Ithaca College School of Music, a long-standing, well-known music institution within a well-known liberal arts college that was founded in 1892 solely as a conservatory of music.
 Roger, a civil engineer, played bass.  He did two tours with Astrud Gilberto.
 Jeanne, a pre-school teacher, played flute.

Glenn, Steve, and Ray all earned music degrees from Ithaca College – Steve: Bachelor of Music (1964) and a Master of Music (1968); Ray: Bachelor of Music (1968). Ray's nephew (Steve's son) –  Miles Brown – is a jazz bassist, performer, and music educator.

Ray's father, Glenn Earl Brown (1914–1965; 1936 graduate of Ithaca College School of Music), was the District Music Supervisor of Public Schools for Long Beach, New York. He was also director of bands at Long Beach Jr. Sr. High School from 1938 to 1965.  As a pioneer in jazz education at the scholastic level, he introduced stage bands to Long Beach public schools in 1939.  He also ran a music camp — Lake Shore Music Score — at Lake Winnipesaukee, Center Harbor, New Hampshire. Glenn Brown had been, for more than 14 years, a marimba soloist with the Xavier Cugat Orchestra.

Ray's mother, Marie Brown ( Ward) (1916–2002), taught English at Boardman Junior High School in Oceanside for 28 years, where, before retiring from the Oceanside School District in 1982, she served as curriculum coordinator and English department chairwoman. She earned a Bachelor of Music degree from the Ithaca College School of Music in 1935, where she played piano, saxophone, and clarinet. She also held a Masters in English from Hofstra University.

Selected compositions/arrangements
Compositions/arrangements for the Stan Kenton Orchestra
 "Call Me Mister" (Kenton Chart Nos. 565 & 1168)
 "Hit and Run" – EP305104 © 1972 V1718P086 (Kenton Chart No. 488)
 "Is There Anything Still There?" – EP304505 © 1972 V1718P086 (Kenton Chart No. 800)
 "Mi Burrito" – EP354892 © 1973 V1718P086 (Kenton Chart No. 975)
 "Neverbird" (Kenton Chart No. 564)
 
Arrangement for the Stan Kenton Orchestra
 "Angel Eyes", Matt Dennis & Tom Adair, arr. Ray Brown
Other compositions/arrangements
 "Route 81 North" (arrangement)
 "Clyde's Glides"
 "Double Fault Blues"
 "AfterThoughts"
 "The Opener"
 "My Man Willie"
 "Tomas Gatos"
 "Arthur Author"
 "Two Rare T-Bones"
 "Procrastination City" – copyright no. EP354893 © 1973 V1718P086
 "Big D and Me" – copyright no. PA0000398365 © 1988
 "Blues for the two K's" – copyright no. PAu000444456 © 1982
 "Got the time?" – PA0000398368 © 1985
 "Haziness" – copyright no. PA0000250024 © 1984
 "Hop, skip, and a Jump" – copyright no. PAu000313614 © 1981
 
 "Little Jeannette Leigh" – copyright no. PA0000250023 © 1983
 "No Timeouts Left" – copyright no. PA0000398361 	© 1988
 "Spectrum" – copyright no. PA0000250025 © 1984
 "Three to go" – copyright no. PA0000398367 © 1985
 "Straightahead City"
 "Bossa Barbara" by Steve Brown, arr. Ray Brown
 "Embraceable You/Quasimodo" – Gershwin / Charlie Parker, arr. Ray Brown
 "The Telephone Song" – Music by Menescal, Portuguese words by Boscoli, English words by Gimbel, arr. Ray Brown
 "Bittersweet" – Willie Maiden, transcribed by Ray Brown
 "Our Love Is Here To Stay" – George Gershwin, arr. Ray Brown
 "Del Sasser" – Sam Jones, arr. Ray Brown
 "Kayak" – Kenny Wheeler, arr. Ray Brown
 "Barbara" – Horace Silver, arr. Ray Brown
 "I Could Write a Book" – Rodgers & Hart, arr. Ray Brown
 "The Thumb" – Wes Montgomery, arr. Ray Brown
 "The Ballad of Thelonious Monk" – Jimmy Rowles, arr. Ray Brown
 "Stella By Starlight" – Victor Young, arr. Ray Brown
 "I.C. Light" – Ray Brown (commissioned for the retirement of Steve Brown, March 2008)
 "Turn Out The Stars", by Bill Evans, arr. Ray Brown
 "Louie's Prima"

Selected discography

 The Session, Studio Band of the United States Army Field Band (Brown is one of three arrangers), recorded Washington, D.C., Nov. 1972
 "Route 81 North", arr. Ray Brown
 "Is There Anything Still There?" arr. Ray Brown

As a member (jazz trumpet/flugelhorn) of the Stan Kenton Orchestra

 Stan Kenton Today (recorded live, Fairfield Halls, Croydon, Surrey, UK, February 10, 1972, 2nd show), originally released in 1972 by Creative World Inc. (2 LPs, quadraphonic), re-released by Dutton Vocalion (2 CDs), 2005
Selections from a Feb 6, 1972, live audience BBC recording (same band) (Ray is 25 years old in these recordings.)
 , by Hank Levy (Ray Brown is one of the jazz soloists.)
 
 
 
 The Four Freshmen:  Live at Butler University, with Stan Kenton and his Orchestra, Creative World Inc. (2 LPs, quadraphonic), 1972; re-released by GNP Crescendo Records (CDs), 1986
 National Anthems Of The World, Creative World Inc. (2 LPs, quadraphonic), 1972
 Clearwater 72 (recorded at the Fort Harrison Hotel, Clearwater, FL, Mar 1972), Hitchcock Media  (1 CD), 2002
 Rhapsody in Blue (Live, Las Vegas), 1972

Arrangement recorded by the Stan Kenton Orchestra

 Kenton For Collectors Vol. 3 (recorded live, Towson State University, July 27, 1976), Dynaflow (CD) (released October 16, 2007)
 "Angel Eyes", by Matt Dennis & Tom Adair, arr Ray Brown

As a member of the Full Faith & Credit Big Band

 Debut, Palo Alto Records, 1980 (Ray Brown conducts, arranges, and plays flugelhorn); 
 JazzFaire, with Madeline Eastman, Palo Alto Records (LP), 1983 (Ray Brown conducts, arranges, and plays flugelhorn); 
 "Hop, Skip & a Jump", arr Ray Brown
 "Like Someone in Love", arr Ray Brown
 "I remember Clifford", arr Ray Brown
 "Barbara", arr Ray Brown
 "A Time for Love", arr Ray Brown
 "Can't Handle It", arr Ray Brown
 FF&C III, Sea Breeze (1 LP), 1988; re-released (1 CD) by Sea Breeze, 1994

As leader of Ray Brown's Great Big Band

 Impressions of Point Lobos, Brown Cats Productions , Ithaca, NY (CD), 1997; 
 Kayak Brown Cats Productions , Ithaca, NY (CD), 2009; 

Other recordings

 Ray Brown & Steve Brown: An introduction to jazz improvisation: a basic method of study for all musicians, Piedmont Music Co., Melville, NY (LP), 1975
 Gary Bartz: Music is My Sanctuary, 1975
 Los Angeles City College Jazz Band, 1981 (Ray Brown arranges Is There Anything Still There?)
 Grover Mitchell: Butter Jazz Chronicles, 1978
 Norman Connors: This is Your Life, late 1970s

 Frank Wess/Harry Edison Orchestra: Dear Mr. Basie (recorded live, Kan-i Hoken Hall, Tokyo, Nov 1989) Concord, 1989
 Ernestine Anderson, with the Clayton/Hamilton Orchestra: Boogie Down (recorded Aug 18, 1990) (1 CD), 1989
 Great Moments with Ernestine Anderson (1 CD) Concord Jazz, Nov 8, 1993
Recorded from 1976 to 1990, at Alley Cat Bistro, Culver City, CA; Coast Records, San Francisco; Concord Summer Festival, Concord Pavilion, Concord, CA; Fujitsu-Concord Jazz Festival, Tokyo; Mad Hatter Recording Studios, Los Angeles; Ocean Way Recording Studios, Hollywood, CA
 Michael Paulo : Fuse Box (1 CD) GRP, 1990
 Michael Paulo : Don't Let Go (1 CD) GRP, 1990
 Michael Paulo : Rainbow Room (1 CD) GRP, 1990
 Miles Davis & Michel Legrand: Dingo (film soundtrack), 1990
 Buddy Collette: Live at El Camino College (recorded May 19, 1990, Torrance, CA), 1990
 Mel Torme: Sent for You Yesterday, Concord Jazz, 1990
 David Benoit: Over the Edge (1 CD) GRP, 1991
 David Benoit: Still Standing (1 CD) GRP, 1991
 The Clayton-Hamilton Jazz Orchestra: Heart and Soul 1991
 Child's Play, produced by Steve Brown, Cafe Records (1 CD), 1990
 Kirk Whalum: Love Saw It, Columbia, 1993
 Kirk Whalum: The Language of Life, Columbia, 1993
 Landes Jugend Jazz Orchester Hessen: Magic Morning (recorded in Cologne, Germany, Apr 30 - May 4, 1993), Ray Brown is an arranger of four pieces:
 "For Heaven's Sake", comp Donald Meyer, Elise Bretton, & Sherman Edwards, arr Ray Brown
 "Die Autobahn 500", arr Ray Brown
 "Magic Morning", comp by Dan Haerle , arr Ray Brown
 Rickey Woodard: Yazoo City Blues ( 1 CD) Concord, 1994
 Roy Hargrove With Strings: "Moment to Moment", Verve (CD), 2000 (Ray Brown, conductor)
 Live Recording from the Monterey Jazz Festival (recorded Sept. 21, 2002) (private recording, Monterey Jazz Festival tapes held by Stanford University)
 with Charlie Haden, Michael Brecker, & Kenny Barron
 a. "The Night" (composer/arranger unknown)
 b. "American Dreams" (Charlie Haden)
 c. "Trends" (composer/arranger unknown) (possibly titled Travels by Pat Metheny & Lyle Mays)
 d. "Prism" (Keith Jarrett)
 e. "No Lonely Nights" (Keith Jarrett)
 f. "Ron's Place" (Brad Mehldau)
 g. "Nightfall" (Charlie Haden)
 h. "Bird Food" (Ornette Coleman)
 i. "America the Beautiful" (Samuel A. Ward, Katharine Lee Bates)
 Ray Brown (Raymond Harry Brown) conducts the Festival Orchestra on b, e, f, & i

Other published works
 An Introduction to Jazz Improvisation, by Ray Brown and Steve Brown, Piedmont Music (1975);

Selected film- and videoography
 The Music of Stan Kenton (film for television) (note: 1969 is the date given in some resources,
 Production director: Stanley Dorfman
 "Malaga", arr Bill Holman
 "Intermission Riff", by Steve Graham, Ray Wetzel
 "MacArthur Park", by Jimmy Webb
 Mike Vax, Dennis Noday, Jay Saunders, Ray Brown, Joe Marcinkiewicz, trumpet; Dick Shearer, Mike Jamieson, Fred Carter, Mike Wallace, Phil Herring, trombone; Quin Davis, Richard Torres, Kim Frizell, Willie Maiden, Chuck Carter, reeds; Stan Kenton, piano; John Worster, acoustic double bass; John Von Ohlen, drums; Ramon Lopez, Latin percussion
 Festival de Jazz de Montreux, Switzerland 1979 (film for television)
 Count Basie and his Orchestra: Sonny Cohn, Pete Minger, Ray Brown, Nolan Smith (aka Nolan Shaheed) trumpet, fluegel horn; Melvin Wanzo, Booty Wood, Dennis Wilson, trombone; Bill Hughes, bass trombone; Bobby Plater, Danny Turner, Eric Dixon, Kenny Hing, reeds; Charlie Fowlkes, baritone sax; Count Basie, Paul Smith, piano; Freddie Green, guitar; John Clayton, acoustic double bass; Butch Miles, drums; Ella Fitzgerald, Dennis Roland, vocal
 Swing Shift, 1984 film (USA)
 Music by: Patrick Williams; music orchestrated by: Billy May, Michael Moores, Jack Hayes; soundtrack personnel: Conte Candoli, Bob Findley, Dick Hurwitz, Ray Brown, Bill Berry, trumpet; Alan Kaplan, George Bohanon, Buster Cooper, trombone; Marshal Royal, Lanny Morgan, alto sax; Pete Christlieb, Bill Green, tenor sax; Jimmy Rowles, piano; John Pisano, guitar; Monty Budwig, acoustic double bass; Frank Capp, drums
 A Tribute to Count Basie, filmed at Kan-i Hoken Hall, Tokyo, November 11, 1989 (film for television)
Personnel:  Harry "Sweets" Edison, Joe Newman, Snooky Young, Al Aarons, Ray Brown, trumpet; Al Grey, Benny Powell, Grover Mitchell, Michael Grey, trombone; Marshal Royal, Curtis Peagler, alto sax; Frank Wess, tenor sax, flute; Billy Mitchell, tenor sax; Bill Ramsay, baritone sax; Ronnell Bright, piano; Ted Dunbar, guitar; Eddie Jones, acoustic double bass; Gregg Fields, drums.
 Fujitsu Concord Jazz Festival, filmed at Kan-i Hoken Hall, Japan, November 11, 1990 (film for television)
 Personnel:  Ray Brown, Pete Minger, Joe Newman, Snooky Young, trumpet; Arthur Baron, Grover Mitchell, Dennis Wilson, Douglas Purviance, trombone; Bill Ramsay, Curtis Peagler, alto sax; Frank Wess, tenor sax, flute; Billy Mitchell, tenor sax; Babe Clarke, baritone sax; Tee Curson, piano; Ted Dunbar, guitar; Eddie Jones, acoustic double bass; Dennis Mackrel, drums, Mel Torme, vocal, drums.

Honors and awards
Ithaca College School of Music
Brown family who studied at the Ithaca College School of Music:  As part of the Ithaca College School of Music expansion (2001), a chamber jazz room was added as a gift from Steve McCluski '74 and Kim Joslyn McCluski '74 in honor of the Brown family. A plaque there honors seven members of the Brown family who graduated from Ithaca College:
1) Glenn Brown (1914 – 1965) — Ithaca College School of Music (IC) 1936 (Ray's father)
2) Marie Brown ( Ward; 1916 – 2002) — IC 1935 (Ray's mother)
3) Stephen Charles Brown — Ithaca College (IC) Bachelor of Music 1964; Master of Music 1968 (Ray's second oldest brother)
4) Barbara Katz Brown — IC 1974; 1975 (Steve's wife)
5) Ray Brown — IC 1968
6) Sue Brown — IC 1971 (Ray's wife)
7) Glenn Edward Brown — IC 1959 (Ray's oldest brother)
14th Annual Gail Rich Awards — Cultural Council Associates (of the Santa Cruz County arts community) (Jan 26, 2010)
 Ray and Sue Brown were two of seven being honored — they were being honored for their creative work as music teachers
 (fast forward to 4:13)

See also
 List of jazz arrangers

External links
 Ray Brown's profile at Cabrillo College
 Review of Ray Brown's Great Big Band recording
 website for Ray Brown's Great Big Band

References
Notes

Inline citations

1946 births
Living people
American jazz trumpeters
American male trumpeters
Swing trumpeters
American jazz composers
American male jazz composers
American music arrangers
Jazz arrangers
American jazz bandleaders
American jazz educators
Jazz educators
People from Oceanside, New York
Jazz musicians from New York (state)
21st-century trumpeters
Educators from New York (state)
21st-century American male musicians